Eponymous medical signs are those that are named after a person or persons, usually the physicians who first described them, but occasionally named after a famous patient. This list includes other eponymous entities of diagnostic significance; i.e. tests, reflexes, etc.

Numerous additional signs can be found for Graves disease under Graves' ophthalmopathy.

See also
 Medical eponyms
 Pathognomonic
 List of medical triads and pentads

References

signs